Hochkreuz is a Bonn Stadtbahn station served by lines 16, 63 and 67. It is located on the Bad Godesberg branch, the next four stops are underground, including the terminus.

This station is located near the High Cross.

References

Cologne-Bonn Stadtbahn stations